Baglietto are superyacht builders of La Spezia, Italy. They build yachts 100 ft and longer. It was founded in 1854.

Products

 Litoraneo class patrol boat for Guardia di Finanza c. 1950s; 3 transferred to Maritime Squadron of the Armed Forces of Malta in 1992

See also

 Azimut Yachts
 Benetti
 Codecasa
 Fincantieri
 Rossinavi
 Sanlorenzo
 List of Italian companies

References
Boat Design: Classic And New Motorboats - Page 342 books.google.com/books?

External links

Baglietto Official website

Manufacturing companies established in 1854
Yacht building companies
Shipbuilding companies of Italy
Italian boat builders
Italian companies established in 1854
Italian brands
Companies based in Liguria
La Spezia